The sarisa or sarissa was a long spear or pike about  in length. It was introduced by Philip II of Macedon and was used in his Macedonian phalanxes as a replacement for the earlier dory, which was considerably shorter. These longer spears improved the strength of the phalanx by extending the rows of overlapping weapons projecting towards the enemy, and the word remained in use throughout the Byzantine years to sometimes describe the long spears of their own infantry.

Composition and utility
It had a sharp iron head shaped like a leaf and a bronze butt-spike, which could be anchored in the ground to stop charges by the enemy. The spike was sharpened well enough to pierce an enemy shield. The bronze material of the butt-spike prevented it from rusting. The spike also served to balance out the spear, making it easier for soldiers to wield, and could be used as a back-up point should the main one break.

The sheer bulk and size of the spear required the soldiers to wield it with both hands, allowing them to carry only a  shield (pelta) suspended from the neck to cover the left shoulder. Its great length was an asset against hoplites and other soldiers bearing shorter weapons, as they had to get past the sarissas to engage the phalangites. However, outside the tight formation of the phalanx, the sarissa was of limited utility as a weapon and a hindrance on the march. As such, it was usually composed of two lengths and was joined by a central bronze tube only before a battle. The two parts were carried on the soldier's back during these marches.

Tactics
Complicated training ensured that the sarissophoroi wielded their sarissas in unison, swinging them vertically to wheel about, then lowering them to the horizontal. The uniform swish of the sarissas daunted the Illyrian hill tribesmen against whom the young Alexander fought in an expedition early in his reign.

The sarissa-bearing phalanx would usually march to battle in open formation to facilitate movement. Before the charge, it would tighten its files to close formation or even compact formation (synaspismos). The tight formation of the phalanx created a "wall of pikes", and the pike was so long that there were fully five rows of them projecting in front of the front rank of men—even if an enemy got past the first row, there were still four more to stop him. The back rows bore their pikes angled upwards in readiness, which served the additional purpose of deflecting incoming arrows.

The Macedonian phalanx was considered invulnerable from the front, except against another such phalanx; the only way it was generally defeated was by breaking its formation or outflanking it, such as how Romans were able to defeat the Macedonians in the Battle of Cynoscephalae.

History of use
The invention of the sarissa is credited to Philip II, father of Alexander the Great. Philip drilled his soldiers to use these pikes with two hands.  By the end of Philip's reign the previously fragile northern Greek kingdom of Macedon controlled the whole of Greece and Thrace.

Alexander used the sarissa armed phalanx in across Asia, conquering Egypt, Persia and the Pauravas (northwest India). The sarissa-wielding phalanxes were vital in every early battle, including the pivotal Battle of Gaugamela where the Persian king's scythe chariots were utterly destroyed by the phalanx, supported by the combined use of companion cavalry and peltasts (javelineers). During his later campaigning, Alexander gradually reduced the importance of the phalanx and the sarissa, as he modified his combined use of arms to incorporate Asian weapons and troops, not specifically trained in Macedonian battle tactics.

The sarissa remained the core of Hellenistic, and especially Diadochi armies.

See also
 Ancient Macedonian military
 Battle of Chaeronea (338 BC)
 Pole weapon
 Xyston

Notes

References

External links
Photos of Hoplite spear compared to Macedonian sarissa

Personal weapons
Ancient weapons
Greek inventions
Polearms
Ancient Greek military terminology
Ancient Macedonian military equipment